The Balkan Music Award is an annual Balkan music award show held every year in different cities of the Balkans. The first edition of the show was held on May 16, 2010 in Sofia, Bulgaria, where many famous and young Balkan artists were awarded. The show is organised and hosted by Balkanika Music Television.

2010 Balkan Music Awards
The Balkan Music Awards 2010 started in December 2009, where people voted online for the 2009 Balkan music. 
 Best Female Performer in the Balkans 2009 – Hadise (from Turkey)
 Best Male Performer in the Balkans 2009 – Željko Joksimović (from Serbia)
 Best Duet/Group in the Balkans 2009 – Akcent (from Romania)
 Best Video in the Balkans 2009 - "Stin Pira" performed by Anna Vissi (from Greece)
 Award for exceptional contribution to the development and popularisation of the Balkan music - Anna Vissi (from Greece).

Results
The Results for "The Best Song in Balkans 2009" (The main prize)

2011 Balkan Music Awards
Balkan Music Awards of 2011 voting started in end of the March and ended on April 8.

Performers
 Inna (from Romania) (Confirmed)

Awards
This year there are going to be 16 categories, different from last year, there is going to be the award for "Worldwide Breakthrough Artist" who is already been taken by Inna, "Balkan Project"

Results
The Results for "The Best Song in Balkans 2010" (The main prize)

2013 Balkan Music Awards

Awards
 Best Male Artist: Serdar Ortaç (from Turkey)
 Best Female Artist: Inna (from Romania)
 Best Group: maNga (from Turkey)
 Best Video:  "Love in Brazil" by Andreea Banica (from Romania)
 Best Balkan Project: Teodora and Giorgos Giannias  - Za teb zhiveia (from Bulgaria and Greece)
 The Results for The Best Song in Balkans 2012 (The main prize)

Designaciones 
„Best Duet/Group in the Balkans for 2011” - MANGA – 
„Best Balkan project for 2011” – „PITAM TE POSLEDNO” -  EMANUELA FEAT SERDAR ORTAC – , 
„Best Music Video in the Balkans for 2011” – „AFER DHE LARG” - ELVANA GJATA – 
„Best world breakthrough of a Balkan artist for 2011” - Alexandra Stan – 
„Best Male Artist in the Balkans for 2011” - SERDAR ORTAC – 
„Best Female Artist in the Balkans for 2011” – Inna –

References

 
Southeastern European music